Peter Ballauff and Rüdiger Haas were the defending champions, but did not compete this year.

Sergio Casal and Emilio Sánchez won the title by defeating Carlos Costa and Horacio de la Peña 6–3, 6–4 in the final.

Seeds

Draw

Draw

References

External links
 Official results archive (ATP)
 Official results archive (ITF)

Campionati Internazionali di Sicilia
1990 ATP Tour
Camp